Elections to the Baseball Hall of Fame for 1951 followed the same rules as 1950.
The Baseball Writers' Association of America (BBWAA) voted once by mail to select from major league players retired less than 25 years. It elected two, Jimmie Foxx and Mel Ott. Meanwhile, the Old-Timers Committee, with jurisdiction over earlier players and other figures, did not meet. A formal induction ceremony was held in Cooperstown, New York, on July 23, 1951, with National League president Ford Frick in attendance.

BBWAA election 

The 10-year members of the BBWAA had the authority to select any players active in 1926 or later, provided they had not been active in 1950. Voters were instructed to cast votes for 10 candidates; any candidate receiving votes on at least 75% of the ballots would be honored with induction to the Hall.

A total of 226 ballots were cast, with 2,167 individual votes for 86 specific candidates, an average of 9.59 per ballot; 170 votes were required for election.  The two candidates who received at least 75% of the vote and were elected are indicated in bold italics.

The voters' focus this year was on sluggers. Mel Ott  and Jimmie Foxx both had over 500 home runs on their resumes. Rounding out the top five were batting average champions Paul Waner, Harry Heilmann, and Bill Terry. Popular hurler Dizzy Dean was sixth.

Sources

References

External links
1951 Election at www.baseballhalloffame.org

Baseball Hall of Fame balloting
1951 in baseball